Rhiannon Grace Clements (born 1 December 1994) is an English actress. Whilst studying at the Academy of Live and Recorded Arts, Clements began starring in various theatre productions, and went on to be awarded Best Stage Actor at the Spotlight Prize in 2019. Then from 2020 to 2021, she portrayed the role of Summer Ranger in the Channel 4 soap opera Hollyoaks. For her portrayal of the role, Clements was nominated in the Newcomer category at the 26th National Television Awards, as well as receiving three nominations at the 2021 Inside Soap Awards.

Early life
Clements was born in Blackburn, England. She was born with a foreshortened left arm. At the age of four, Clements was enrolled into dance classes by her mother in order to boost her confidence, but she felt that dance was not right for her, and instead enrolled herself into youth theatre classes. Clements attended Ribblesdale High School in Clitheroe, and ALRA North. At ALRA North, she studied towards and obtained a degree in acting.

Career
In 2018, Clements made her professional stage debut in a production of The Tempest; she then starred in various other stage productions, including Alice in Wonderland, Wuthering Heights and The Glass Menagerie. In 2019, she was awarded Best Stage Actor at the Spotlight Prize. One of the judges highlighted Clements' performance as a standout from the ceremony, stating that she connected to the audience well. Following auditioning for various roles after relocating to Manchester in 2019, Clements booked a role as Bescot in two episodes of the BBC series Doctor Who. In 2020, it was announced that Clements had joined the cast of the Channel 4 soap opera Hollyoaks as Summer Ranger, the daughter of established character Cormac (James Gaddas). When Clements' agent phoned her to inform her that she had booked the role, she thought that it would be bad news. She expressed her excitement at joining Hollyoaks since she watched the soap whilst growing up. Months into her tenure, it was confirmed that Summer would be a villain. During her time on the series, Clements appeared in an episode of its online documentary spin-off series Hollyoaks: IRL, where she discussed the representation of her disability on the soap. After her character is imprisoned, Clements announced her departure from Hollyoaks, but stated that she intends on returning to the soap in the future. For her portrayal of Summer, Clements received a shortlist nomination in the Newcomer category at the 26th National Television Awards. Later in 2021, Clements received three nominations at the Inside Soap Awards. Then in 2022, she was nominated for the British Soap Award for Villain of the Year. Also that year, she appeared in the Channel 4 comedy series Big Boys.

Filmography

Stage

Awards and nominations

References

External links
 

1994 births
21st-century English actresses
Amputee actors
English film actresses
English stage actresses
English soap opera actresses
English television actresses
Living people
People from Blackburn